The TeST TST-3 Alpin T is a Czech shoulder-wing, T-tailed, single-seat glider and motor glider that was designed and produced by TeST of Brno.

Design and development
The TST-3 was produced in many forms, including as plans and kits or various levels of completion for amateur construction and also as a factory completed aircraft. It was produced as a motor glider with a retractable engine and also as a pure glider. Production is complete and the type is no longer available.

The TST-3 is of mixed construction, using fibreglass, wood and aircraft fabric covering. The  span wing is equipped with winglets and a Wortmann FX 61-184 airfoil. The tractor configuration Hirth F-33  motor is mounted on a strut that retracts aft into a bay behind the cockpit and is enclosed by two doors. The landing gear is retractable monowheel gear.

Two were reported to have been completed by December 2000. In December 1998 the glider version was US$13,000. In December 2000 the kit was US$10,000, complete aircraft US$23,300 and the plans US$350. In 2004 the complete aircraft was €22,880.

Variants
TST-3 Alpine TM
Motorized version

Specifications (TST-3 Alpin TM)

See also

References

External links
Photo of TST-3

TST-3
1990s Czech and Czechoslovakian sailplanes
Homebuilt aircraft
Shoulder-wing aircraft
Motor gliders
T-tail aircraft